The Old City of Freiburg is part of the city and business centres of Freiburg im Breisgau and is the core of the original city. It is divided into the two districts 111 Altstadt-Mitte and 112 Altstadt-Ring. The Altstadt-Mitte district was the city's build-up area at the time of its foundation and therefore formed the old city. The district Altstadt-Ring is connected westwards to the railway line and south to the Dreisam.

At the end of 2020, about 7,500 people were reported as inhabitants of this district.

The district of Altstadt-Mitte was designed according to the pattern of all cities founded by the Zähringers. A street cross divides the city into four quarters, the church and the city hall are not located in the same district. The city centre is the Bertoldsbrunnen, where the Kaiser-Joseph-Straße and Salz- and Bertoldstraße intersect. The city administration is located in the Old and New city hall. In the late 1990s, however, the head of the administrative region of Freiburg moved its headquarters from the Old City into a new building in the district of Betzenhausen, but the seat of the government president remained in the Basler Hof in the Old City.

Neighbouring districts include Stühlinger to the west, Neuburg to the north, Oberau to the east and beyond the Dreisam the Wiehre to the south.

Tourist attractions 
The Old City is dominated by the Freiburg Minster at the Minster Square. Also most of the other architectural sight of the city, like the Schwabentor, Martinstor, Augustiner Museum are located in the Old City. The Freiburger Bächle are at their highest in the Old City and flow from there across the entire city centre. The Schlossberg is directly adjacent to the Old City. From the Schlossbergturm, or Castle Hill Tower, you are about have a circular view of all the city's districts and surrounding areas.

Shopping 
Apart from the Münstermarkt on Minster square, most department stores and shops as well as many restaurants are situated in the very heart of the Old City. The majority of mainstream shops can be found on Kaiser-Joseph-Straße.

Since 1979, the city hosts an annual outdoor art and design market called Kunst in der oberen Altstadt (English literally: Art in the upper old city) featuring many artists and designers of a number of different handicrafts.

Culture and education 
The Old City is the center for cultural life in Freiburg. The Theater Freiburg, the Konzerthaus Freiburg, most of the museums and cinemas, the headquarters of the city's library as well as the Planetarium located at the Freiburg's main train station are all located in the Old City.

Alternative culture is also accessible in the Old Town, mainly in the Viertel Im Grün (named after the street of the same name) between the Konzerthaus and the Dreisam. Two centers are the Sprecht Passage, the Jos Fritz shop, the cafe with the same name, the Harrys Depot, the Grether factory, a former foundry, which includes the Radio Dreyeckland studios, the Rosa Hilfe Freiburg and the Strandcafé.

The University of Freiburg is also located in the Old City, alongside the faculties of humanities and social sciences as well as the university library.

Transport 
The district of Altstadt-Mitte has been a pedestrian zone since the mid-1870s. After the ring road was blocked between the two districts in 2012, the pedestrian zone was partially extended to the district Altstadt-Ring. The boundaries of the built-up old city form multi-lane streets as the main traffic arteries of individual traffic. Car parking is concentrated to several car parking areas on the main traffic axes, whilst in other streets residents have their own car parks.

On the two main axes of the Old City, the Kaiser-Joseph-Straße and Berrtoldstraße and Salzstraße (to the east of Bertoldsbrunnen) are now served by trams. The intersection of the lines at Bertoldsbrunnen is the most important hub of public transport in Freiburg, as the city center is located next to the main railway station on the edge of the Old City and the border to Stühlinger.

Literature 
 Official map = 1:25,000 
 Leo Schmidt: Kulturdenkmale in der Freiburger Alstadt. In: Denkmalpflege in Baden-Württemberg, 12. 1983, Book 4, pg. 169-178 (PDF; 8.5 MB) (in German)

References

External links
www.freiburg.de 
www.obere-altstadt-freiburg.de

Quarters of Freiburg im Breisgau